Carl A. Nafzger (born August 29, 1941, in Plainview, Texas) is an American Hall of Fame horse trainer. Before he was involved in horseracing he was a championship rodeo bull rider.

Nafzger trained Unbridled who won the 1990 Kentucky Derby and Breeders' Cup Classic. In 1990 he was voted the Eclipse Award for Outstanding Trainer and the Big Sport of Turfdom Award. In 1994, he wrote a book on the training of Thoroughbred horses titled Traits Of A Winner that was published by R. Meerdink Co..

In 1998, Nafzger trained Banshee Breeze who won that year's Eclipse Award for Outstanding 3-Year-Old Filly. In 2006 he was back in the national spotlight as the trainer of the colt Street Sense who won the 2006 Breeders' Cup Juvenile and the 2007 Kentucky Derby. In the late 2000s and early 2010s, Nafzger moved into semi-retirement, training only for two clients: James B. Tafel, owner of Street Sense, and Bentley Smith. Smith's first wife (who died in 1999) was the daughter of Unbridled's owner, Frances A. Genter, and ran the Genter stable before its dissolution.

Nafzger was inducted into the Texas Rodeo Cowboy Hall of Fame in 2008.

Bull riding career

Nafzger competed in bull riding throughout the 1960s, and qualified for the National Finals Rodeo 3 separate times. He retired from bull riding in 1972, after suffering a bad leg fracture.

Horse training career
Following the end of his bull riding career, Nafzger went to California from his home in Texas and began training Thoroughbred racehorses. He had his first Kentucky Derby win in 1990, with Unbridled. His second Kentucky Derby winner was Street Sense, in 2007.

Awards and honors

 2007 PBR Ring of Honor
 2007 Texas Horse Racing Hall of Fame
 2008 Texas Cowboy Hall of Fame 
 2008 National Museum of Racing and Hall of Fame
 2008 Texas Rodeo Cowboy Hall of Fame
 2020 Ben Johnson Memorial Award

References

External links
Carl Nafzger's profile at the NTRA

1941 births
Living people
People from Plainview, Texas
American horse trainers
Eclipse Award winners
United States Thoroughbred Racing Hall of Fame inductees
Bull riders
Professional Bull Riders: Heroes and Legends